Score is a 2017 album by Croatian duo 2Cellos, produced by them, in conjunction with Nick Patrick. It features songs from movies and TV shows, such as Schindler's List and Game of Thrones. The album was preceded by the single "Game of Thrones".

The duo were backed on the album by the London Symphony Orchestra with Robin Smith acting as arranger and conductor.

The album was promoted by a performance at the London Palladium on 22 March, with a world tour to start in July 2017.

Track listing
All tracks arranged by Luka Sulic and Stjepan Hauser.

Charts

References

2017 albums
2Cellos albums